Gulf Air Flight 072 (GF072/GFA072) was a scheduled international passenger flight from Cairo International Airport in Egypt to Bahrain International Airport in Bahrain, operated by Gulf Air. On 23 August 2000 at 19:30Arabia Standard Time (UTC+3), the Airbus A320 crashed minutes after executing a go-around upon failed attempt to land on Runway 12. The flight crew suffered from spatial disorientation during the go-around and crashed into the shallow waters of the Persian Gulf  from the airport. All 143 people on board the aircraft were killed.

The crash of Flight 072 remains the deadliest aviation accident in Bahraini territory, and was the deadliest accident involving an Airbus A320 at the time, which was later surpassed by TAM Airlines Flight 3054, which crashed on 17 July 2007 with 199 fatalities.

The final report was issued on 15 August 2002, concluded that the individual factors contributed to the accident was non adherence to a number of Standard Operating Procedures (SOP) and loss of spatial and situational awareness by the aircraft crew during the approach and final phases of the flight. A number of systemic factors were also contributed to the accident, including deficiency in crew resource management (CRM) training by Gulf Air and safety oversights by the Directorate General Of Civil Aviation and Meteorology of Oman.

Aircraft
Flight 072 was operated with an Airbus A320-212, serial number 481, registration A4O-EK. It was first flown on 16 May 1994, and was delivered new to Gulf Air in September 1994. The aircraft was powered by two CFM International CFM56-5A3 engines. It had accumulated more than 17,000 hours in 14,000 cycles before the crash. Its last maintenance was conducted on 17–18 August 2000. The aircraft was in compliance with all applicable airworthiness directives for the airframe and engines.

Passengers and crew

The aircraft was carrying 135 passengers, two pilots, and six cabin crew members from 17 countries, mostly from Egypt and Bahrain. One Egyptian who was supposed to board the flight was turned away by immigration officials in Cairo who found his passport was not stamped with the necessary Egyptian interior ministry permit for working abroad.

Crew
There were two pilots in the aircrew:
 The Bahraini captain and pilot in command was 37-year-old Captain Ihsan Shakeeb. He joined Gulf Air as a cadet pilot in 1989 and, after training he was promoted to First Officer of the Lockheed L-1011 in 1994, First Officer of the Boeing 767 in 1994, First Officer of the Airbus A320 in 1998 and to Captain of the Airbus A320 in 2000. Shakeeb had 4,416 hours of flying experience (including 1,083 hours on the Airbus A320), of which 86 were as captain.
 The First officer was 25-year-old Khalaf Saeed Al Alawi. He joined Gulf Air as a cadet pilot in 1999 and promoted to First Officer of the Airbus A320 in 2000. Al Alawi had 608 hours of flying experience, 408 of them on the Airbus A320.

Passengers
Among the 135 passengers were 61 men, 37 women and 37 children (including eight infants).

A 144th set of remains was found, and was identified as a fetus that had been delivered during the crash, but this was not counted as a fatality in the final report.

Accident

Flight 072 departed from Cairo at 16:52 local time with 143 passengers and crew on board. At 19:22 Dammam approach gave the flight approval for self navigation to land on runway 02. First officer Al Alawi then contacted Bahrain approach, informing that they would be landing on runway 02. The approach was too high and the flight crew carried out an unusual low altitude orbit in an attempt to correct the approach. The orbit was unsuccessful and a go-around was attempted. While carrying out a turning climb, the aircraft entered a descent at 15 degrees nose down. The ground proximity warning system (GPWS) activated, first sounding a "sink rate" alarm and then nine "whoop whoop pull up" alarms, which continued to sound until impact. The aircrew did not respond to repeated GPWS warnings and approximately one minute after starting the go-around the aircraft disappeared from radar screens. At 19:30:02, the aircraft crashed into the sea. There were no survivors.

Investigation

The accident investigation concluded that the primary cause of the crash was pilot error (including spatial disorientation), with a secondary factor being systemic organizational and oversight issues.The investigation showed that no single factor was responsible for the accident to GF-072. The accident was the result of a fatal combination of many contributory factors, both at the individual and systemic levels.
 The individual factors particularly during the approach and final phases of the flight were:
 The captain did not adhere to a number of Standard Operating Procedures (SOPs), such as:
 significantly higher than standard aircraft speeds during the descent and the first approach
 not stabilising the approach on the correct approach path; performing an orbit, a non-standard maneuver, close to the runway at low altitude
 not performing the correct go-around procedure
 other related items
 In spite of a number of deviations from the standard flight parameters and profile, the first officer (PNF) did not call them out, or draw the attention of the captain to them, as required by SOPs.
 A perceptual study indicated that during the go-around after the orbit, it appears that the flight crew experienced spatial disorientation, which could have caused the captain to perceive (falsely) that the aircraft was 'pitching up'. He responded by making a 'nose-down' input, and as a result, the aircraft descended and flew into the shallow sea.
 Neither the captain nor the first officer perceived, or effectively responded to, the threat of increasing proximity to the ground, in spite of repeated hard GPWS warnings.
 The systemic factors, identified at the time of the above accident, which could have led to the above individual factors, were:
 Organisational factors (Gulf Air):
 A lack of training in CRM contributing to the flight crew not performing as an effective team in operating the aircraft.
 Inadequacy in the airline's A320 training programmes, such as: adherence to SOPs, CFIT, and GPWS responses.
 The airline's flight data analysis system was not functioning satisfactorily, and the flight safety department had a number of deficiencies.
 Cases of non-compliance, and inadequate or slow responses in taking corrective actions to rectify them, on the part of the airline in some critical regulatory areas, were identified during three years preceding the accident.
 Safety oversight factors:
A review of about three years preceding the accident indicated that despite intensive efforts, the DGCAM as a regulatory authority could not make the operator comply with some critical regulatory requirements.

The chairperson of the accident investigation board adopted the report on 10 July 2002.
The investigation showed that:

...during the go-around, as the captain was dealing with the flap over-speed situation, he applied a nose-down side-stick input, resulting in a nose-down pitch. While the aircraft was accelerating with TOGA power in total darkness, the somatogravic illusion could have caused the captain to perceive (falsely) that the aircraft was 'pitching up'. He would have responded by making a 'nose down' input. The aircraft descended and flew into the sea.

Aftermath
After the accident, Hamad bin Isa al-Khalifa, the Emir of Bahrain, declared three days of national mourning.

Gulf Air retired the Flight 072 (GF072) flight number and replaced it with Flight 070 (GF070) for inbound flights from Cairo to Bahrain.

See also

 Accidents and incidents involving the Airbus A320 family
 List of accidents and incidents involving airliners by airline
 List of accidents and incidents involving commercial aircraft
 List of aircraft accidents and incidents resulting in at least 50 fatalities
 

Specific incidents
 1950 Air France multiple Douglas DC-4 accidents
 Afriqiyah Airways Flight 771
 Armavia Flight 967
 Flash Airlines Flight 604
 Kenya Airways Flight 507

Notes

References

External links
 Accident Investigation Report (Archive) – Civil Aviation Affairs – Hosted by the Bureau of Enquiry and Analysis for Civil Aviation Safety (BEA)
 Alternate URL for whole report: Accident Investigation Board (AIB) Final Report – Gulf Air Flight GF-072 Airbus A320-212, REG. A40-EK on 23 August 2000 at Bahrain
 GULF AIR STATEMENT ON THE PUBLICATION OF THE ACCIDENT INVESTIGATION BOARD'S (AIB) FINAL REPORT INTO GF072 (Archive) - Gulf Air - 15 July 2002
 Cockpit Voice Recorder transcript and accident summary
 Gulf Air statement on the publication of the accident (Archive) 15 July 2002.
 Crash in the Gulf (Archive), CBS News
 
 Pre-crash photos of A40-EK
 Salvage operation on the crash site from Associated Press Archive

Airliner accidents and incidents caused by pilot error
Aviation accidents and incidents in Bahrain
Aviation accidents and incidents in 2000
2000 in Bahrain
Accidents and incidents involving the Airbus A320
Airliner accidents and incidents involving controlled flight into terrain
Gulf Air accidents and incidents
August 2000 events in Asia